The men's tournament was one of two handball tournaments at the 1988 Summer Olympics. It was the sixth appearance of a men's handball tournament as a medal event at the Olympic Games.

Qualification

Team rosters

Preliminary round

Group A

Group B

Final round

Eleventh place game

Ninth place game

Seventh place game

Fifth place game

Bronze medal game

Gold medal game

Rankings and statistics

Final ranking

Top goalscorers

References

Men's tournament
Men's events at the 1988 Summer Olympics